Stagecoach Strathtay is a Scottish bus operating company which covers the Dundee and Angus areas, and parts of Grampian. It is a subsidiary of the Stagecoach Group, which bought Strathtay Scottish Omnibuses Ltd as part of Yorkshire Traction in 2005. Strathtay Scottish was formed in 1985 as a subsidiary of the Scottish Transport Group, from parts of Walter Alexander & Sons (Midland) Ltd and Walter Alexander & Sons (Northern) Ltd. Stagecoach have retained the right to the operating name Strathtay Scottish; this is reflected in the legal lettering on the company's vehicles.

Operation

Since joining the Stagecoach Group, Stagecoach Strathtay now has an operating area bounded by Aberdeen in the north, Gauldry & Newport-on-Tay to the south and Perth to the west. Before joining Stagecoach, Strathtay operated only as far as Laurencekirk in the north; however, the Montrose depot has acquired some work from Bluebird's Stonehaven depot, including route 24 from Brechin to Stonehaven, route 103 from Laurencekirk to Aberdeen and a handful of School Contracts serving Mackie Academy in Stonehaven.

Strathtay is the largest operator in Angus and operates urban, rural and interurban services in and around Dundee, Arbroath, Blairgowrie, Forfar  and Montrose.  Depots are located in Dundee, Arbroath and Blairgowrie.  On its creation Strathtay was also the largest operator in Perth, Crieff and Pitlochry, but depots in those towns were closed between 1986 and 1993 and operations scaled back, ironically due to intensive 'Stagecoach' competition at the time. In 2010 Montrose depot closed due to contract losses.
A depot exists in Forfar but is considered to be a sub depot of Arbroath.

Strathtay also provide coaches for Scottish Citylink and Megabus express work, mainly from Dundee and Perth to other points in Scotland.

Although Strathtay's Head Office at Dundee bus station has been closed, there still remains a Booking/Depot Office at that site. Head Office functions were amalgamated with Stagecoach East Scotland (which also covers Fife and Perth operating areas) at Guthrie House in Cowdenbeath. On 18 May 2009, the Cowdenbeath head office was relocated to Evans House, John Smith Business Park, Kirkcaldy.

History

Strathtay Scottish was a brand new company created through reorganisation of the Scottish Bus Group in preparation for deregulation of the bus industry in 1986, and eventual privatisation. It inherited the eastern operations of W. Alexander & Sons (Midland) based in Perth, Crieff and Pitlochry, as well as the southern operations of W. Alexander (Northern) in Dundee, Forfar, Arbroath, Blairgowrie and Montrose. A bright blue and orange livery was adopted for the fleet, which would be controlled from Dundee.

The company would have a turbulent infancy, however, as Strathtay Scottish faced very heavy competition from Perth-based operator Stagecoach. Strathtay Scottish purchased a number of ex-London Transport AEC Routemaster buses to compete with Stagecoach, which also used a number of the same vehicle type on city services in Perth. A new Perth City Transport brand was created by Strathtay Scottish to compete with Stagecoach, using a mainly red livery with white. But as Stagecoach grew nationally it became financially stronger and had ready access to vehicles from the larger companies in England it had purchased; Strathtay's managing director, Neil Renilson, would later move to Stagecoach in 1989. Strathtay Scottish could not sustain the level of intense competition that ensued, and in 1993 it closed its Perth depot. Crieff and Pitlochry also closed, and the company withdrew from the majority of services around these towns.

Despite experiencing heavy and sustained competition on the lucrative city services in Perth, Strathtay Scottish managed to remain profitable on the run up to privatisation, and in May 1991 was sold to Barnsley-based Yorkshire Traction for £1.9 million. Now trading as Strathtay Buses under the Traction Group, the new owners established and maintained a working relationship with Stagecoach around Perth, jointly operating the trunk service between Dundee and Perth with the national operator, while the remainder of the operations remained largely unchanged from privatisation.

On 14 December 2005, the Traction Group was purchased by Stagecoach for £26 million, which resulted in Strathtay becoming a subsidiary of Stagecoach East Scotland. Unusually, buses were initially branded with modified Strathtay fleetnames, however the fleet has since been rebranded to "Stagecoach Strathtay".

References

External links
 Stagecoach Strathtay website

Stagecoach Group bus operators in Scotland
Companies based in Fife
Transport in Angus, Scotland
Transport in Aberdeenshire
Transport in Dundee
Transport in Fife
Transport in Perth and Kinross
1985 establishments in Scotland
Transport companies established in 1985